Euponera is a ponerine genus of ants distributed in the Afrotropics (including Madagascar) and eastern Asia. Workers are large (6–10.5 mm); queen are similar to workers, but larger and winged.

Species

Euponera aenigmatica (Arnold, 1949)
Euponera agnivo Rakotonirina & Fisher, 2013
Euponera antsiraka (Rakotonirina & Fisher, 2013)
Euponera brunoi Forel, 1913
Euponera daraina Rakotonirina & Fisher, 2013
Euponera fossigera Mayr, 1901
Euponera gorogota Rakotonirina & Fisher, 2013
Euponera grandis Donisthorpe, 1947
Euponera haratsingy Rakotonirina & Fisher, 2013
Euponera ivolo Rakotonirina & Fisher, 2013
Euponera kipyatkovi Dubovikoff, 2013
Euponera maeva Rakotonirina & Fisher, 2013
Euponera manni Viehmeyer, 1924
Euponera mialy Rakotonirina & Fisher, 2013
Euponera nosy Rakotonirina & Fisher, 2013
Euponera pilosior Wheeler, W.M., 1928
Euponera rovana Rakotonirina & Fisher, 2013
Euponera sakishimensis Terayama, 1999
Euponera sharpi Forel, 1901
Euponera sikorae (Forel, 1891)
Euponera sjostedti (Mayr, 1896)
Euponera tahary Rakotonirina & Fisher, 2013
Euponera vohitravo Rakotonirina & Fisher, 2013
Euponera weberi Bernard, 1953
Euponera wroughtonii Forel, 1901
Euponera zoro Rakotonirina & Fisher, 2013

References

Ponerinae
Ant genera
Hymenoptera of Asia
Hymenoptera of Africa